Circumferential Road 3 (C-3), informally known as the C-3 Road, is a network of roads and bridges that all together form the third beltway of Metro Manila in the Philippines.

History 
The development of a major road network in Manila was first conceived in the Metropolitan Thoroughfare Plan of 1945, predicting that the metropolis in the 1940s will expand further to the shorelines of Laguna de Bay. The plan proposed the laying of circumferential roads 1 to 6 and radial roads 1 to 10.

Metro Manila Skybridge 
The Metro Manila Skybridge was a proposed six-lane elevated expressway that could have formed the missing link of C-3 between G. Araneta Avenue in Quezon City and South Avenue in Makati with several interchanges.

The project was cancelled due to the Skyway Stage 3 project occupying the portion of the San Juan River located on the boundaries of Manila, Mandaluyong, San Juan, and Quezon City, which could have been utilized to establish the road link to the next segment of the road system. Currently, no other methods nor proposals have been raised to complete the road link.

Route description

C-3 Road 

C-3 Road is the portion of C-3 from R-10 in Navotas to Baltazar Street, located past the Philippine National Railways railroad crossing and the Caloocan Interchange of the NLEX Harbor Link and Connector projects in Caloocan.

5th Avenue 

Past Baltazar Street, C-3 becomes 5th Avenue, a six-lane, two-way traffic roadway from Caloocan to A. Bonifacio Avenue in Quezon City. Prior to its expansion, this roadway was a two-lane, one-way traffic roadway eastwards. The expansion aimed to accommodate and connect C-3 Road (east) and C-3 Road (west) to both eastbound and westbound traffic. Being the fifth avenue running east–west from the city's border with Manila in the south, it passes through the areas of Grace Park West, Grace Park East, and Barrio San Jose, as well as the northern boundary of La Loma Cemetery, in Caloocan before entering Quezon City.

Sergeant Rivera Street 
After crossing A. Bonifacio Avenue, C-3 becomes Sgt. Rivera Street, a main road in Quezon City with six lanes. Skyway's alignment over C-3 begins at this road. It becomes G. Araneta after turning southwards after its intersection with Santo Domingo Avenue. Oftentimes, the names G. Araneta and Sgt. Rivera are interchangeably used by people in this segment of the C-3.

Gregorio Araneta Avenue 

C-3 becomes G. Araneta Avenue after turning southwards after its intersection with Santo Domingo Avenue up to where it was cut short in San Juan via the N. Domingo Street. This area of the C-3 is well known for its big funeral parlors such as Arlington and La Funeraria Paz, SM City Sta. Mesa and the creek from Toctokan Street up to Quezon Avenue which is a flood prone zone due to overflowing during rainy season and it being one of the lowest area in the C-3 (the other is the area where it crosses with Aurora Boulevard).

South Avenue 

C-3 continues in Makati as South Avenue. It is a major north–south thoroughfare that runs from J.P. Rizal Avenue to Metropolitan Avenue. It passes through the western boundary of the Manila South Cemetery. However, it carries one-way northbound traffic since 2017. After passing through Metropolitan Avenue, C-3 becomes Ayala Avenue Extension.

Ayala Avenue Extension 

Ayala Avenue Extension is the northern extension of Ayala Avenue, a major thoroughfare in Makati that passes through the heart of the Makati Central Business District, the economic and financial hub of the Philippines, towards Metropolitan Avenue. It forms the boundary of barangays San Antonio and Bel-Air. It begins as a continuation of South Avenue at Metropolitan Avenue, and ends at Gil Puyat Avenue, where the extension continues south as Ayala Avenue towards EDSA and McKinley Road.

Buendia Avenue 

At the junction with Ayala Avenue, C-3 continues by turning west to Sen. Gil Puyat Avenue up to Roxas Boulevard in Pasay. Along with South Avenue and Ayala Avenue, it passes through the area of the Makati Central Business District. South Luzon Expressway can be accessed through its junction with it. Several provincial bus stations can also be found at its junction with Taft Avenue in Pasay.

References

Routes in Metro Manila